David Curtiss may refer to:
 David Raymond Curtiss, American mathematician
 David Curtiss (swimmer), American swimmer

See also
 David Curtis (disambiguation)